This is a list of mayors of Lisbon (literally: "President of the Municipal Chamber of Lisbon", and also , literally: "President of the Municipality of Lisbon"), the capital city of Portugal, and also the most populated.

This office is considered one of the most important in Portugal's politics, even more sought than the office of minister (following António Costa's resignation from a ministerial position to contest the 2007 elections, which he won).

Graphical timeline (since 1974)

Mayors of Lisbon

See also
 Lisbon City Hall
 Lisbon history and timeline
 Local elections in Portugal

References

External links
 

Government of Lisbon

Lisbon
Lists of political office-holders in Portugal
Lisbon-related lists